{{Infobox country
| native_name            = 
| conventional_long_name = Qi
| common_name            = Southern Qi|
| era                    = 
| status                 = Empire
| status_text            = 
| empire                 = 
| government_type        = Monarchy||||
| year_start             = 479
| year_end               = 502|
| year_exile_start       = 
| year_exile_end         = |
| event_start            = 
| date_start             = 3 June<ref>Book of Southern Qi, vol. 1.</ref>
| event_end              = 
| date_end               = 24 April|
| event1                 = 
| date_event1            = 
| event2                 = 
| date_event2            = 
| event3                 = 
| date_event3            = 
| event4                 = 
| date_event4            = |
| event_pre              = 
| date_pre               = 
| event_post             = 
| date_post              = ||
| p1                     = Liu Song
| flag_p1                = 
| image_p1               = 
| p2                     = 
| flag_p2                = 
| p3                     = 
| flag_p3                = 
| p4                     = 
| flag_p4                = 
| p5                     = 
| flag_p5                = 
| s1                     = Liang dynasty
| flag_s1                = 
| image_s1               = 
| s2                     = 
| flag_s2                = 
| s3                     = 
| flag_s3                = 
| s4                     = 
| flag_s4                = 
| s5                     = 
| flag_s5                = |
| image_flag             = 
| flag                   = 
| flag_type              = |
| image_coat             = 
| symbol                 = 
| symbol_type            = |
| image_map              = Southern Qi map.jpg
| image_map_caption      = Southern Qi and its neighbors. They were bordered by the Northern Wei to the north.
| image_map2             = 
| image_map2_caption     = |
| capital                = Jiankang
| capital_exile          = 
| latd                   = 
| latm                   = 
| latNS                  = 
| longd                  = 
| longm                  = 
| longEW                 = |
| national_motto         = 
| national_anthem        = 
| common_languages       = 
| religion               = 
| currency               = Chinese coin,Chinese cash||
| leader1                = Emperor Gao
| leader2                = Emperor Wu
| leader3                = Emperor He
| year_leader1           = 479–482
| year_leader2           = 482–493
| year_leader3           = 501–502
| title_leader           = Emperor
| representative1        = 
| representative2        = 
| representative3        = 
| representative4        = 
| year_representative1   = 
| year_representative2   = 
| year_representative3   = 
| year_representative4   = 
| title_representative   = 
| deputy1                = 
| deputy2                = 
| deputy3                = 
| deputy4                = 
| year_deputy1           = 
| year_deputy2           = 
| year_deputy3           = 
| year_deputy4           = 
| title_deputy           = ||
| legislature            = 
| house1                 = 
| type_house1            = 
| house2                 = 
| type_house2            = ||
| stat_year1             = 
| stat_area1             = 
| stat_pop1              = 
| stat_year2             = 
| stat_area2             = 
| stat_pop2              = 
| stat_year3             = 
| stat_area3             = 
| stat_pop3              = 
| stat_year4             = 
| stat_area4             = 
| stat_pop4              = 
| stat_year5             = 
| stat_area5             = 
| stat_pop5              = 
| footnotes              = 
| today                  = ChinaVietnam
}}

Qi, known in historiography as the Southern Qi ( or ) or Xiao Qi, was a Chinese imperial dynasty and the second of the four Southern dynasties during the Northern and Southern dynasties era. It followed the Liu Song dynasty and was succeeded by the Liang dynasty. The main polity to its north were the Northern Wei.

 History 
The dynasty began in 479, when Xiao Daocheng forced the Emperor Shun of Liu Song (宋顺帝) into yielding the throne to him, ending Liu Song and starting Southern Qi, as its Emperor Gao. The dynasty's name was taken from Xiao's fief, which roughly occupied the same territory as the Warring States era Kingdom of Qi. The Book of the Qi does not mention whether or not Xiao had any blood relationship to either the House of Jiang or House of Tian, the two dynasties which had previously ruled that kingdom.

During its 23-year history, the dynasty was largely filled with instability, as after the death of the capable Emperor Gao and Emperor Wu, Emperor Wu's grandson Xiao Zhaoye (萧昭业) was assassinated by Emperor Wu's intelligent but cruel and suspicious cousin Xiao Luan (萧鸾), who took over as Emperor Ming, and proceeded to carry out massive executions of Emperor Gao's and Emperor Wu's sons, as well as officials whom he suspected of plotting against him.川本『中国の歴史、中華の崩壊と拡大、魏晋南北朝』、P152

The arbitrariness of these executions was exacerbated after Emperor Ming was succeeded by his son Xiao Baojuan, whose actions drew multiple rebellions, the last of which, by the general Xiao Yan (萧衍) led to Southern Qi's fall and succession by Xiao Yan's Liang Dynasty.

More than fifty percent of Tuoba Xianbei princesses of the Northern Wei were married to southern Han Chinese men from the imperial families and aristocrats from southern China of the Southern dynasties who defected and moved north to join the Northern Wei. Tuoba Xianbei Princess Nanyang (南阳长公主) was married to Xiao Baoyin (萧宝夤), a Han Chinese member of Southern Qi royalty. Xianbei Tuoba Emperor Xiaozhuang of Northern Wei's sister the Shouyang Princess was wedded to the Han Chinese Liang dynasty ruler Emperor Wu of Liang's son Xiao Zong 蕭綜.

 War with Northern Wei 
In 479, after Xiao Daocheng usurped the throne of Liu Song, the Northern Wei emperor prepared to invade under the pretext of installing Liu Chang, son of Emperor Wen of Liu Song who had been in exile in Wei since 465 AD.
Wei troops began to attack Shouyang but could not take the city. The Southern Qi began to fortify their capital, Jiankang, in order to prevent further Wei raids.
Multiple sieges and skirmishes were fought until 481 but the war did not witness any major campaign. A peace treaty was signed in 490 with the Emperor Wu.

 Sovereigns of Southern Qi Dynasty (479–502) 

Sovereigns' family tree

 Notes 

 References 
 Citations 

 Sources 

 Book of Southern Qi History of Southern Dynasties Zizhi Tongjian''

See also 

 Southern and Northern Dynasty
 Chinese sovereign
 Yongming poetry
List of Bronze Age States
List of Classical Age States
List of Iron Age States
List of pre-modern great powers

 
Northern and Southern dynasties
Dynasties in Chinese history
Former countries in Chinese history
479 establishments
5th-century establishments in China
502 disestablishments
6th-century disestablishments in China